Sultan is a village in İpsala district of Edirne Province, Turkey. It is situated to the west of Sultanköy dam. The population of Sultan is 1449 as od 2013. The settlement was founded in 1924 by the Turkish refugees from Greece as a result of Population exchange agreement between Greece and Turkey. In 1934 refugees from Romania and in 1951 refugees from Bulgaria were also settled in the settlement. Before the 2013 reorganisation, it was a town (belde). Main economic activities are dairying and agriculture. Main crops are cereals, sunflower and sugarbeet.

References

Villages in İpsala District